The 2018–19 Major Arena Soccer League season was the eleventh season for the league. The regular season started on November 30, 2018, and ended on April 14, 2019. Each team played a 24-game schedule.

Changes from 2017–18
Expansion
Mississauga MetroStars
Orlando SeaWolves

Relocation
Syracuse Silver Knights to Utica City FC

Returning
Dallas Sidekicks

On Hiatus
Soles de Sonora

Folded
Cedar Rapids Rampage

Standings
 
(Bold) Division Winner

Eastern Conference

Eastern Division

South Central Division

Western Conference

Southwest Division

Pacific Division

2019 Ron Newman Cup

Format
The top two teams from each division qualified for the post-season. The Division Finals were a 2-game home and home series, with a 15-minute mini-game played immediately after Game 2 if the series was tied. The Conference Finals and Championship were single elimination.

Eastern Conference Playoffs

Eastern Division Final

Baltimore wins series 2–1

South Central Division Final

Milwaukee wins series 2–0

Eastern Conference Final

Western Conference Playoffs

Southwest Division Final

Monterrey wins series 2–0

Pacific Division Final

San Diego wins series 2–0

Western Conference Final

Ron Newman Cup Final

Statistics

Top scorers

Playoff top scorers

Awards

Individual awards

All-League First Team

All-League Second Team

All-League Third Team

References

External links
MASL official website

 
Major Arena Soccer League
Major Arena Soccer League
Major Arena Soccer League seasons